Timlin is a surname. Notable people with the surname include:

 Addison Timlin (born 1991), American actress
 Andrew Timlin (born 1974), New Zealand field hockey player
 I.R. Timlin (1880–1955), American architect
 James Timlin (born 1927), former Catholic Bishop of Scranton
 Mark Timlin (born 1944), British author
 Michael Timlin (born 1985), English-born Irish international footballer
 Mike Timlin (born 1966), American Major League Baseball pitcher
 Robert Timlin (1932-2017), American jurist, Senior District Judge for the Central District of California
 Thomas F. Timlin, American politician, member of the Wisconsin State Assembly
 William H. Timlin (1852–1916), American jurist
 William M. Timlin (1892–1943), South African architect and illustrator